Nostromo is a 1904 novel by Joseph Conrad.

Nostromo may also refer to:

Nostromo (TV series), a 1997 British-Italian TV serial
 Nostromo, the fictional starship in the 1979 film Alien
 Nostromo (album), a dark ambient album by SleepResearch Facility, inspired by the fictional starship
 Nostromo, a yacht hired by Latifa bint Mohammed Al Maktoum (II) to aid in her escape from Dubai
 Nostromo (comics), a Marvel Comics character from their Marvel 2099 line.
 Nostromo (game controller), a keypad-based USB video game controller
 nhttpd, the Nostromo web server
 Nostromo (chasma), a chasma on the moon Charon
 Nostromo Defensa, an Argentine defense contractor specializing in UAVs
 , a Swiss metal band
 Nostromo, the fictional planet that was the home world of the Night Lords Space Marine Legion in the Warhammer 40,000 fictional setting.